The Midland train crash was a rail crossing accident that occurred on November 15, 2012 in Midland, Texas. A freight train struck a flatbed trailer being used as a parade float carrying 26 passengers (12 of them United States Armed Forces veterans who had been wounded in action), killing four and injuring 16. The parade was en route to a veterans' benefit sponsored by the local charity Show of Support/Hunt for Heroes.

Accident

At 4:36pm on November 15, 2012, an eastbound Union Pacific Railroad freight train, led by Union Pacific ES44AC locomotive no. 7877, traveling  en route to Shreveport, Louisiana from Los Angeles, California, struck a flat-bed semi-trailer that was acting as a parade float. Of the float's 26 passengers, 12 were US Armed Forces veterans that had been wounded in action, 12 were the spouses of the veterans, and two were civilian escorts. The impact killed two veterans immediately and two more died later at Midland Memorial Hospital; sixteen other passengers were injured. The truck driverDale Hayden, a 24-year US Army veteransurvived, as did the train crewSimon "Trey" Terrazas and Nathan Scott.

Secretary of Defense Leon Panetta made a statement expressing condolences to the victims.

National Transportation Safety Board investigation 
Accident investigators from the National Transportation Safety Board were dispatched to the accident to determine the cause. In a press conference on November 17, NTSB member Mark Rosekind stated that the float started crossing the tracks after the warning bells and lights had been activated and while the crossing gate was lowering. The flashing lights and bell had begun 20 seconds before the train entered the intersection, and 7 seconds later the gate began to come down.  It was one second after that (12 seconds before impact) that the float began crossing the track. The train sounded its horn 9 seconds before the collision; seconds later the engineer also activated the train's emergency brake. The NTSB based these conclusions on video evidence from a dashboard camera mounted on an escorting police cruiser, a forward-mounted camera on the train, and the train's data recorder.

In November 2013, the NTSB issued its report, concluding that the probable cause of this collision was "the failure of the city of Midland and the parade organizer, “Show of Support, Military Hunt, Inc.” (Show of Support), to identify and mitigate the risks associated with routing a parade through a highway – railroad grade crossing." The NTSB also concluded that the city of Midland failed to follow and enforce its own ordinances, allowed the Show of Support parade to take place without a permit from 2009 to 2012, and failed to notify the railroad in advance of the parade.

Union Pacific's installation and programming of the crossing signals

Following several months of investigation it was learned that: 1) Union Pacific was reimbursed with taxpayers' dollars to install signal gates at the crossing; 2) Union Pacific agreed with the State of Texas that when Union Pacific installed the signal gates at the crossing Union Pacific would program the signals to provide motorists with at least 30 seconds of warning time before the arrival of a train; 3) despite its agreement with the State of Texas that Union Pacific would program the signals to give motorists at least 30 seconds of warning time, Union Pacific programmed the signal system to provide only 25 seconds of warning time;

Victims

The four veterans killed in the accident had all been wounded in combat overseas:

References

Railway accidents and incidents in Texas
Midland, Texas
Railroad crossing accidents in the United States
Railway accidents in 2012
2012 disasters in the United States
2012 in Texas
2012 road incidents
Union Pacific
November 2012 events in the United States